

List of Ambassadors

Ben Burgel 2021-
Roi Rosenblit 2018 - 
Paul Hirschson 2015 - 2018
Eliahu Ben-Tura 2011 - 2015
Gideon Behar 2006 - 2011
Daniel Pinhasi 2004 - 2006
Shlomo Avital 2003 - 2004
Shlomo Morgan 2000 - 2002
Doron Mordechai Grossman 1997 - 2000
Arie Avidor 1995 - 1997 
Menachem Carmon 1972 - 1973
Eytan Ruppin 1967 - 1969
Hanan Aynor 1964 - 1967
Victor Eliachar 1962 - 1964

References

Senegal
Israel